Iain Sutherland (Glasgow, 1936) is a British conductor. In 1966 he was appointed Conductor of the BBC Scottish Radio Orchestra) in Glasgow. Previously he had been an orchestral and session violinist in London playing in the LPO, Philharmonia, RPO and ECO under such conductors as  Boult, Sargent, Groves, Solti and Klemperer.  Sutherland was the conductor of the BBC  Scottish Radio Orchestra until a major restructuring was initiated by BBC in 1972 to reduce its coverage of "light" music, in favour of "pop" music. His remit with the BBC SRO included TV as well as Radio. He was Musical Director for many Light Entertainment series with Stanley Baxter, Kenneth McKellar, Moira Anderson and Andy Stewart The orchestra was officially closed in 1981.

In 1973 Sutherland returned to London and was regularly invited by BBC Radio 2 as guest conductor of the BBC Concert Orchestra for the "Friday Night Is Music Night" programme. From 1988 to 1995 he was the principal conductor of the BBC Radio Orchestrauntil it too it was disbanded. During this time he regularly conducted other orchestras across Europe and the UK.
These included the London Symphony Orchestra, Royal Philharmonic Orchestra, The Hallé, English Chamber Orchestra, Royal Liverpool Philharmonic, Royal Scottish National Orchestra, Slovak Philharmonic, Graz Symphony, BRTN Philharmonic (Brussels), NDR Philharmonic (Hannover), Dessau Philharmonic, Brazilian National Symphony, Flemish Radio Philharmonic, Maribor Philharmonic, BR Radio Orchestra (Munich), Cape Philharmonic Orchestra (Cape Town) and the orchestras of SWF (Kaiserslautern), NRK (Oslo) and NOS (Hilversum), and the national youth orchestras of Scotland and Norway. During these decades his international career included giving the world premieres of Malcolm Arnold's "Irish Dances", Edward Harper's "Etude for Orchestra ", Robert Farnon's Third Symphony (Edinburgh), John Dankworth's "Escapade" for jazz quartet and chamber orchestra, the British premiere of Darius Millhaud's "A Frenchman in New York", the Scandinavian premiere of Korngold's Violin Concerto, alongside premieres of the symphonic version of the Mike Oldfield/ David Bedford "Tubular Bells" in Glasgow, "Movimentos para Don Jose Haydn" by Rene Staar in Graz and "Rhapsody Brasillieros" by Ney Rosauro in Rio de Janeiro.

In 1988 he was invited to form the City of Glasgow Philharmonic Orchestra, in preparation for Glasgow City of Culture 1990. His unique "Pops at the Philharmonic" concerts inspired by the Boston Pops proved to be very successful drawing full houses which he continued to conduct until he resigned in 1997. Between 1988 and 2008 he conducted annually at Kenwood House, Glamis Castle and other stately homes during the annual Summer Proms Season.
From 1999 until 2008 he was principal guest conductor at the annual English Haydn Festival, which ran for two weeks in the lovely market town of Bridgnorth under the direction of the eminent Austrian Professor H.C Robbins-Landon. Changes to the funding, co-incidental with the death of John Reid, the leader of the unique period-instrument orchestra, brought about the demise of this internationally famous corner of English culture.
 
International soloists with whom he has performed in concert include Larry Adler; Moira Anderson; Nicola Benedetti; Shirley Bassey; Alfie Boe; Sarah Brightman; Ronald Brautigam; Marlene Dietrich; Helga Dernesch; Maria Ewing; Michael Feinstein; James Galway; Evelyn Glennie; Chloe Hanslip; Nigel Kennedy; Elaine Stritch; the Labèque sisters; Julian Lloyd Webber; Tasmin Little; Benjamin Luxon; Kenneth McKellar; Sherrill Milnes; Julia Migenes: Denis O'Neill; Joshua Rifkin; George Shearing; Mel Tormé; Robert Tear; Willard White, Pretty Yende.

Iain Sutherland's varied repertoire encompasses baroque, classical, romantic and contemporary works as well as the light repertoire of Vienna, Hollywood, Broadway and International Light Music. He conducted Britten's "War Requiem" twice in Bratislava with the Slovak Philharmonic Orchestra and Chorus commemorating the anniversary of the end of WW2, and the Mozart "Requiem" in the City of London with the London Orpheus Chorus and Philharmonic Orchestra on 7th.July,2008, the first anniversary of the London "7/7" terrorist attack.

Iain Sutherland was Musical Director for a series of BBC radio recordings of classic musicals: "Guys and Dolls"; "Finian's Rainbow";"My Fair Lady"; "The Music Man"; "Kiss Me, Kate"; "Sweet Charity" and Stephen Sondheim's legendary "Follies" which was recorded "live" at a Gala concert at the Theatre Royal, Drury Lane which Sondheim attended. All-star casts for these recordings included: John Barrowman, Tom Conti, Mary Carew, Anita Dobson, Jim Dale, Janie Dee, Marilyn Hill Smith, Bonnie Langford, Julia Migenes, Julia McKenzie, Ron Moody, Donna McKechnie, Claire Moore, Milo O'Shea, Denis Quilley and Elizabeth Seal. For NDR Hanover he recorded Bernstein's "Candide" and "West Side Story" with the NDR Philharmonic and Principal artists of Hanover Opera.

Recordings: "Hail Caledonia:Scotland in Music"(2022) Somm Ariadne(A spectacular album full of inspirational melodies that go straight to the heart: Classic Music Daily): "Favourite Orchestral Classics(2021) Somm Ariadne; *Great Classics of Film Music Vol.2"(2020);"Great Classics of Film Music"(2019); Somm Ariadne;  "Sailng By-25 Brirish Light Classics"(2019);"Leroy Anderson Favourites"(2016):(his performances of music of this character are endemic to a conductor who seems to have these pieces as part of his cardio-vascular system, this attractive music benefitting hugely from the quality this gifted conductor brings to it): Musical Opinion (2016): •"Orient Express: 20 Light Classics Europe and beyond" (2014):•"Manhattan Playboys:American Light Classics" (2013)*"The Merrymakers:British Light Classics" (2012):•"In London Town: A musical tour of the historic sights of London" (2011). •"Scotland's Tunes of Glory": "The Classics Collection" (4 albums; Scottish/Irish/Viennese/Christmas).•"Schindler's List" with Tasmin Little: •”Simply Maria" with Maria Ewing, and •"Waltzing In The Clouds"(The music of Robert Stolz) with Julia Migenes, on BBC Records. To mark the centenary of Leonard Bernstein(2018), his album," BERNSTEIN: BROADWAY to HOLLYWOOD", was released on SOMM RECORDS, conducting the HANNOVER PHILHARMONIE. "Symphonic Dances WEST SIDE STORY": "CANDIDE OVERTURE": "FANCY FREE (Complete Ballet)": "ON THE WATERFRONT SYMPHONIC SUITE": "Two Dance Episodes ON THE TOWN".
("Iain Sutherland's performances of Bernstein's more well-known orchestral pieces in musical understanding could hardly be bettered"). MUSICAL OPINION.

In 2015, Iain Sutherland was awarded the Gold Badge of Merit by the British Academy of Songwriters, Composers and Authors for Lifetime Achievement and his unique contribution to British music.

He has also been honoured to conduct for many Royal Charity concerts including the Royal Variety Performance in the presence of HM Queen Elizabeth the Queen Mother at the Palladium; and with star soloists and the English Chamber Orchestra at St. James's Palace, Whitehall Palace, the Barbican and the Royal Albert Hall, attended by the Royal Patrons of the charities involved: TRHs Princess Margaret, Princess Diana, Princess Alexandra, the Duchess of Kent, the Duchess of Gloucester.

Laying aside his baton he has taken part in many varied radio and television programmes including the panel game "Call My Bluff", and he has also been a guest debater at the Oxford Union.
Iain Sutherland is also highly regarded for his many light orchestral compositions and arrangements.

Iain Sutherland is married to former Harrods fashion model Barbara Williams. He is not related to fellow-conductor Gavin Sutherland nor to the late  pop singer Iain Sutherland of the Sutherland Brothers. His interests are history, current affairs, good food and wine and following the fluctuating fortunes of Partick Thistle and Chelsea.

References

British male conductors (music)
Living people
1936 births
21st-century British conductors (music)
21st-century British male musicians